McGurk: A Dog's Life is a 1979 television pilot created for NBC and the last television concept created by Norman Lear to become a pilot.  The show starred Barney Martin, Beej Johnson, Charles Martin Smith and Sherry Lynn.  Only one half-hour pilot episode was made of this offbeat costume comedy. It was shown only once on ABC on June 15, 1979 at 8:00 PM EST.Copp, Earle (14 June 1979). Copp's Beat, Free Lance Star  The show featured the actors portraying the roles of the family dogs and wearing dog costumes. Lear's intention was to do an All in the Family style show using the dog's point of view to discuss controversial social and racial biases.

Peter J. Boyer of the Associated Press reviewed the pilot negatively, stating that "except for the dog suits, it's a formula sitcom with familiar subjects."

Plot summary of pilot episode
"Curtains for McGurk"
McGurk is the old family dog whose life becomes complicated when his owners adopt a young, eager-to-please pup named Tucker. Iris is McGurk's love interest, while Camille is Iris's young pup who takes an instant liking to Tucker.

Cast
Barney Martin ... McGurk
Beej Johnson... Iris
Charles Martin Smith... Tucker
Sherry Lynn ... Camille
Michael Huddleston ... Turk
Hamilton Camp ... Spike

Production team
Norman Lear ... Executive producer
Peter Bonerz ... Director
Charles Hauck ... Producer
Ken Stump ... Associate producer
Charles Hauck ... Writer

Title song
The show's title song was "We're your dogs", and was sung and performed by the four principal cast members.

Similar shows
 Dinosaurs
 Father of the Pride

References

External links
 

1979 American television episodes
1970s American comedy television series
1970s American television specials
NBC original programming
Television pilots not picked up as a series